The following is a list of people related to Wayne State University.

Alumni

Academia
 Sandra Arlinghaus, professor at University of Michigan Ann Arbor
 Rudine Sims Bishop, educator and "mother of" multicultural children's literature
 Arthur Danto, Emeritus Johnsonian Professor of Philosophy at Columbia University
Wayne Dyer, self-help author and motivational speaker
 Paul M. Fleiss, pediatrician, father of Heidi Fleiss
 William J. Kaiser, professor and former department chair of Electrical Engineering at UCLA
 Abdi Kusow, professor of sociology and anthropology at Oakland University
 Emmett Leith, Schlumberger Professor of Engineering at the University of Michigan and recipient of the National Medal of Science
 Douglas McGregor, management professor at the MIT Sloan School of Management and president of Antioch College (1948 to 1954)
 Nancy Milio, originated the notion of healthy public policy, Professor Emeritus of Nursing and Professor Emeritus of Health Policy and Administration, School of Public Health, University of North Carolina at Chapel Hill
Raphael Munavu from Kenya, a colleague of  African studies scholar and author Godfrey Mwakikagile. His wife Salome, also from Kenya, was also a student at Wayne State University where she earned a master's degree in library and information science. After he earned his doctorate in chemistry, Raphael returned to Kenya with his wife where he became a professor of chemistry at the University of Nairobi and his wife head of the university's library. One of Munavu's students in chemistry at the University of Nairobi was William Ruto who became Vice President of Kenya under Uhuru Kenyatta. Ruto was also the main speaker at Salome Munavu's funeral in Machakos in June 2021. Raphael Munavu also served as vice-chancellor of Moi University, appointed by President Daniel arap Moi. He also served as chairman of the Kenya National Examination Council appointed by President Mwai Kibaki, chairman of the National Academy of Sciences, chancellor of Laikipia University, and chairman of the Council of South Eastern University College which later became a full-fledged university. Vice President Ruto, in his campaign to succeed Uhuru Kenyatta as President of Kenya, chose Professor Munavu to be a member of his think tank and one of the country's leading academics to manage his presidential campaign against former Prime Minister Raila Odinga in August 2022. William Ruto won the presidential election and Raphael Munavu continued to be one of his closest and most trusted advisers
 Godfrey Mwakikagile, Tanzanian scholar, author, Africanist, academic and political theorist; author of non-fiction books on African history, politics, and economics found in university and public libraries throughout the world; they are primarily for academicians. He went to school in the United States with the assistance of his managing editor at Tanzania's largest newspaper the Daily News, Benjamin Mkapa, who later served as ambassador to the United States and Canada at different times, Minister of Foreign Affairs among other cabinet posts, and President of Tanzania for two consecutive five-year terms
 Saul K. Padover, historian and political scientist at The New School of Social Research in New York City
 Sidney Ribeau, former President of Bowling Green State University, President of Howard University
 Rita Richey, first woman to earn a Ph.D. in instructional technology
 Dr. Michael Schwartz (attended), President of Cleveland State University, former President Emeritus of Kent State University
Jacquelyn Taylor, Helen F. Pettit Professor of Nursing and Founder and executive director, Center for Research on People of Color at Columbia University
Dennis Chima Ugwuegbu, Nigeria's first professor of psychology
 Stanley E. Zin, Richard M. Cyert and Morris H. DeGroot Professor of Economics and Statistics, Carnegie Mellon University; Frisch Medal winner

Broadcasting and journalism
 Tony Brown, journalist, comedian, and businessman
 Rachelle Consiglio, Executive Producer, The Jerry Springer Show and The Steve Wilkos Show; wife of Steve Wilkos
 Hugh Downs, news anchor for ABC's 20/20
 Wayne Dyer, author, self-help advocate
 Mark Fritz, Pulitzer Prize-winning reporter
 Bob Giles, retired 40-year Detroit broadcast news manager for WWJ-TV News, WDIV-TV News, and WXYZ-TV Action News; inducted into Michigan Journalism Hall of Fame in 2012
 Darren M. Haynes, SportsCenter anchor at ESPN in Bristol, Connecticut
 Jerry Hodak, former Chief Meteorologist for WXYZ-TV Detroit
 Casey Kasem, radio host
 Carol Martin, news anchor and journalist
 Elvis Mitchell, New York Times film critic (1999-2004), entertainment critic for NPR's Weekend Edition, host of The Treatment on KCRW; programmer of the LACMA Film Screening Program
 Helen Thomas, former White House correspondent; "First Lady of the Washington press corps"
Bill Randle, disc jockey, Detroit and Cleveland - attended.

Business
 Tom Athans, co-founder and former CEO of the liberal-progressive Democracy Radio
Mark Bertolini, CEO of Aetna
Howard Birndorf, biotechnology entrepreneur, founding director of Neurocrine Biosciences
 Larry Brilliant, executive director of Google.org
 Bill Davidson, industrialist, billionaire, majority owner of the Detroit Pistons
 Yousif Ghafari, founder and chairman of Ghafari, Inc., philanthropist, and U.S. Ambassador
 Dan Gilbert, president and founder of Rock Financial and Quicken Loans, majority owner of the Cleveland Cavaliers
 Peter Karmanos, Jr., founder and CEO of Compuware Corporation; owner of the Carolina Hurricanes, Plymouth Whalers, and Florida Everblades hockey franchises
 Madhusudhan Rao Lagadapati, chairman and CEO of Lanco Infratech. 29th richest person in India with US$2.3 billion in 2010 by Forbes
 David M. Overton, founder and CEO of The Cheesecake Factory, Inc.
 Dhiraj Rajaram, founder and chairman of Mu Sigma, Inc.
 Stephen M. Ross, law school graduate; real estate developer; provided $100 million naming gift for Ross School of Business; Forbes 400 rank: #68 at $4.5 billion
 David Salzman (1969), television producer and businessman

Computers, engineering, and technology
Neal Vernon Loving (aeronautical engineering), turbulence specialist
Harold Mertz (mechanical engineering), created the standard crash test dummy (Hybrid III)
 Ali Nasle (electrical engineering), founder of EDSA Micro Corporation; wrote the world's first digital short circuit program
 Lawrence Patrick (mechanical and aeronautical engineering), researcher in the area of automotive passenger safety; vice president for research and development of Libbey Owens Ford Company, the original manufacturer of laminated safety glass
 John Sawruk (mechanical engineering) engineer and executive with GM

Art and design
 Susan Aaron-Taylor, mixed media sculptor, professor (retired) at Cranbrook Academy of Art
 Edith Altman, artist
 Diane Carr, artist
 Niels Diffrient, industrial designer
 Garth Fagan, dancer and choreographer 
 Tyree Guyton, artist, created the Heidelberg Project
 Ian Hornak, founding artist of the Hyperrealist and Photorealist fine art movements
 Leonard D. Jungwirth, sculptor
 Stanley Lechtzin, jewelry and metal artist, founding member of the Society of North American Goldsmiths
 Hughie Lee-Smith, painter
 Oxana Narozniak, Ukrainian-Brazilian sculptor
Arthur Seigel, photojournalist, educator and artist
Darryl DeAngelo Terrell, photographer, curator
 Timothy Van Laar, artist
 R. John Wright, doll designer and maker

Government and politics
 John D. Altenburg, Army Major General, authority for military commissions covering detainees at Guantanamo
 Christine Beatty, former Detroit Chief of Staff; involved in the Kilpatrick and Beatty text-messaging scandal
 Scott Boman, Michigan politician
 Cora Brown, first African American woman to be elected to a state senate (D-Michigan)
 Chen Pi-Chao, former Vice Minister of National Defense for Taiwan, 2000–2002
 Ken Cockrel Jr., former Mayor of Detroit
 John Conyers, former member of the United States House of Representatives (D-Michigan)
 Keith Ellison, the first Muslim elected to the United States Congress, currently the Attorney General of Minnesota (D-Minnesota)
 William D. Ford, former member of the U.S. House of Representatives (D-Michigan)
 Yousif Ghafari, former US Ambassador to Slovenia
 Mitch Greenlick, former member of the Oregon House of Representatives
 Jenean Hampton, former Lieutenant Governor of Kentucky
 Lawrence Kestenbaum, creator and webmaster of The Political Graveyard
 Nancy Lenoil, State Archivist of California
Andrew Marshall, founding director of the Office of Net Assessment at the U.S. Defense Department
Fuat Oktay, the first and current Vice President of Turkey
 Bruce Patterson, former member of the Michigan Senate; former Wayne County Commissioner
 Gary Peters, member of the United States Senate (D-Michigan)
 Teresa Stanek Rea, former acting Under Secretary of Commerce for Intellectual Property and former acting Director of the United States Patent and Trademark Office
 Lynn N. Rivers, former member of the U.S. House of Representatives (D-Michigan)
 Alma G. Stallworth, former member of the Michigan House of Representatives
Ulana Suprun, former acting Minister of Healthcare of Ukraine
Amadou S.O. Taal from The Gambia, a graduate of Wayne State University, schoolmate and roommate of renowned Africanist and author Godfrey Mwakikagile when both were students at Wayne State during the same time in the seventies. Taal returned to The Gambia where President Dawda Jawara appointed him to a senior cabinet-level position in which he served until Jawara was overthrown in a military coup led by Yahya Jammeh in 1994. Twenty-four years later in 2018, Taal was appointed by President Adama Barrow as Gambia's ambassador to Nigeria and the Economic Community of West African States (ECOWAS) and to 12 other African countries including Ghana and Angola
 Rashida Tlaib, one of the first two Muslim women elected to the U.S. Congress (D-Michigan)
 John Townsend, member of the Wisconsin State Assembly

Law
Shereef Akeel, lawyer, notable for pursuing human rights and civil liberties cases on the behalf of Arab Americans and Muslim Americans
Sam Bernstein, attorney, founded high-profile firm The Law Offices of Sam Bernstein
Patricia Boyle, former U.S. federal judge
Irma Clark-Coleman, member of the Michigan Senate, former member of the Michigan House of Representatives
John Conyers, U.S. Representative since 1964
George Cushingberry, Jr., member of the Michigan House of Representatives, youngest ever elected
Nancy Garlock Edmunds, senior U.S. federal judge
Tod Ensign, veterans' rights lawyer, founder of the advocacy group Citizen Soldier
Richard Alan Enslen, United States District Court judge
Dan Gilbert, chairman and founder of Rock Ventures and Quicken Loans Inc.
Elizabeth L. Gleicher, judge on the Michigan Court of Appeals
Denise R. Johnson, first woman appointed to the Vermont Supreme Court
Damon Keith, Senior judge for the United States Court of Appeals
Marilyn Jean Kelly, former chief justice of the Michigan Supreme Court
Joan Mahoney, law scholar, former professor and Dean of the Wayne State University Law School
Dorothy Comstock Riley, former justice of the Michigan Supreme Court and the first woman to serve on the Michigan Court of Appeals
Henry Saad, jurist, Michigan Court of Appeals
John Weisenberger, former attorney general of Guam

Literature
 Albert Cleage, author, founder of the Black Christian National Movement
 Dorothy Marie Donnelly, poet
 Paula Gosling, mystery novelist
 Stanley Gray, poet
 Mariela Griffor, poet and novelist, journalist
 Robert Hayden, poet, Consultant in Poetry to the Library of Congress
 Philip Levine, United States Poet Laureate and Pulitzer Prize winner
 Thomas Ligotti, horror story writer
 Raynetta Mañees, romance novelist
 Dudley Randall, poet and publisher
 Warren Rovetch, travel writer
 Houseman, Phyllis Greenberg. romance novelist, Master of Science Education

Magic
 Al Schneider, author and magician known for developing the Matrix magic trick

Military
 Christopher W. Lentz, United States Air Force Brigadier General
 Adolph McQueen, United States Army Major General; first commander of the Joint Detention Group at Joint Task Force Guantanamo; Deputy Commander of United States Army North

Motion pictures
Deva Katta, director, screenwriter

Performing arts
 Al Aarons, jazz trumpeter
 Pepper Adams (attended), jazz baritone saxophonist and composer 
 Patricia Alice Albrecht, actress, voice over actress, and writer, voice of Pizzazz in Jem
 Dorothy Ashby, jazz harpist and composer
 Anita Barone, actress, The War at Home
 Cherie Bennett, novelist, actress, director, playwright, newspaper columnist, singer, and television writer for The Young and the Restless
 Bob Birch, bassist for the Elton John Band
 Ben Blackwell (attended), musician
 Kenny Burrell, jazz guitarist
 Donald Byrd, trumpeter
 Larry Joe Campbell, actor and comedian, cast member of According to Jim
 Council Cargle, theater and film actor
 Toi Derricotte, poet
 Chad Everett, actor, star of Medical Center and Mulholland Drive
 Garth Fagan choreographer, won Tony Award for The Lion King
 Artie Fields (attended), bandleader, songwriter, record producer and jazz trumpeter
 Chris Fehn, custom percussionist for the metal band Slipknot
 Jeff Frankenstein (attended), keyboardist for Christian pop/rock band Newsboys, dropped out in 1994 to pursue his career with the band
 Curtis Fuller, trombonist
 Frank Gillis, jazz pianist, ethnomusicologist
 Joe Henderson (attended), jazz musician
 Sean Hickey, composer
 Ernie Hudson, actor, Oz, Ghostbusters
 Art James, TV game-show host
 Thorsten Kaye, actor, All My Children, One Life to Live, Port Charles
 Yusef Lateef (attended), jazz musician
 Lazarus, physician, rapper and songwriter from Detroit
 James Lentini, composer and guitarist
 Philip Levine, Pulitzer Prize-winning poet; Distinguished Poet in Residence for the Creative Writing Program at New York University
 Joseph LoDuca, Emmy Award-winning composer
 Dave Marsh (attended), music writer, co-founder of Creem magazine
 Tim Meadows, actor, Saturday Night Live, Mean Girls
 Barbara Meek, actress, Archie Bunker's Place
 S. Epatha Merkerson, actress, Law & Order, Lackawanna Blues
 Kenya Moore, Miss USA 1993 and Miss Michigan USA 1993
 Martin Pakledinaz, costume designer, won Tony Awards for Thoroughly Modern Millie and the 2000 revival of Kiss Me, Kate
 Bobby Pearce, Broadway costume designer
 Bill Prady (attended), television writer and producer
 David Ramsey, actor, Dexter, Blue Bloods, Mother and Child, and Arrow
 Crystal Reed, actress, Teen Wolf
 Della Reese, actress, singer, minister
 Lloyd Richards, stage director, Tony Award for Seven Guitars, Joe Turner's Come and Gone, and A Raisin in the Sun
 Sixto Rodriguez (BA Philosophy, 1981), folk musician, subject of documentary Searching for Sugar Man
 Ruben Santiago-Hudson, Michael Hayes; Tony Award for Seven Guitars
 Kierra Sheard, contemporary gospel singer 
 George Shirley, opera singer, 2015 recipient National Medal of Arts
 Darryl Sivad, actor and comedian
 Tom Sizemore, actor, Saving Private Ryan, Black Hawk Down
 Tom Skerritt, Emmy Award-winning actor; has appeared in more than 40 films and 200 television episodes
 Avo Sõmer, musicologist, music theorist, and composer
 Jeffrey Tambor, actor, The Larry Sanders Show, Arrested Development
 Barbara Tarbuck, actress, General Hospital; Fulbright Scholar
 Sonya Tayeh, choreographer on So You Think You Can Dance
 Ron Teachworth, educator, artist, writer, filmmaker (Going Back)
 Lily Tomlin (attended), actress, Nashville, The West Wing, Murphy Brown, Flirting with Disaster, I Heart Huckabees
 Allan von Schenkel, double bassist, performance artist, music promoter, and composer
Charlotte Mitchell, director "Gimme Shelter," Oscar winner

Medicine
Scott Dulchavsky, trauma surgeon and NASA researcher
Gerald May, psychiatrist
Robert Provenzano, nephrologist
Wolfram Samlowski, medical oncologist
Robert L. Williams, psychologist

Religion
 Dario Hunter, first Muslim-born person to be ordained a rabbi
John Drew Sheard, Sr., Presiding Bishop of the Church of God in Christ

Science
Werner Emmanuel Bachmann, chemist; pioneer in steroid synthesis: carried out the first total synthesis of a steroidal hormone, equilenin; his name is associated with the Gomberg-Bachmann reaction
 Mary Kim Joh, wrote a Korean anthem
Emmett Leith, co-inventor of three-dimensional holography; awarded the National Medal of Science in 1979 by President Jimmy Carter
Jerry Linenger, astronaut; spent five months living on the Russian space station Mir
Sultana N. Nahar, physicist, astronomer
Shirley E. Schwartz (M.S. 1962, Ph.D. 1970), chemist and research scientist at General Motors

Sports
 Anthony Bass, starting pitcher for the San Diego Padres; Major League Baseball draft (MLB) draft selection in 2008 (5th round)
 Tom E. Beer, former linebacker for the Detroit Lions
 Joique Bell, Wayne State all-time leading rusher; former running back for the Detroit Lions
 Gregory Benko (born 1952), Olympic foil fencer
 Ron Berger, former football player for the New England Patriots 
 Hunter Brown, 2019 MLB draft selection (5th round) who plays for the Houston Astros
 Rick Byas, cornerback for the Atlanta Falcons
 Ken Doherty, Olympic bronze medalist, decathlon (1928)
 Phil Emery, former General Manager for the Chicago Bears
 Ben Finegold, chess grandmaster
 Byron Krieger (1920-2015), foil, sabre, and épée fencer; NCAA champion; two-time Pan Am gold medalist; two-time Olympian; two-time Maccabiah Games gold medalist
 Allan Kwartler (attended; 1917–1998), sabre and foil fencer; Pan-American sabre champion and three-time gold medal winner; three-time Olympian, and two-time gold medal winner at the Maccabiah Games
 Dan Larson, Major League Baseball pitcher (1976-1982)
 Danny Lewis (born 1970), American-English basketball player
Stavros Paskaris, former professional ice hockey player
 Fred Snowden, former assistant coach at the University of Michigan; former head coach of the University of Arizona men's basketball teams; first black head coach of a major university's basketball program in America's history
 Otmar Szafnauer, team principal of Alpine F1 Team and former racing driver
 Allen Tolmich, track and field athlete; established or tied 11 U.S. track and field records in 1938, set world hurdling records
 Lorenzo Wright, track and field athlete; gold medal winner in the 1948 Olympics (400-meter relay)

Honorary graduates 
 Ernie Harwell, sportscaster
 Carl Levin, U.S. Senator
 James Lipton, actor, television host
 Jessye Norman, soprano
 Stephen Yokich, former UAW president
Jack White, musician

Faculty and staff

University presidents

 1933 - 1942: Frank Cody
 1942 - 1945: Warren E. Bow
 1945 - 1952: David D. Henry
 1952 - 1965: Clarence B. Hilberry
 1965 - 1971: William R. Keast
 1971 - 1978: George E. Gullen, Jr.
 1978 - 1982: Thomas Bonner
 1982 - 1997: David Adamany
 1997 - 2009: Irvin Reid
 2009 - 2010: Jay Noren
 2011 - 2013: Allan Gilmour
 2013–present: M. Roy Wilson

Professors
Norman Allinger, computational chemist, winner of the Benjamin Franklin Medal in Chemistry
Dora Apel, Professor Emerita of Modern and Contemporary Art
Jerry Bails, popular culturist; "father of comic book fandom;" former assistant professor of Natural Science
Albert T. Bharucha-Reid, Dean of the School of Arts and Sciences; Markov chain theorist and statistician
Susan Bies, member of the Board of Governors of the Federal Reserve System; Assistant Professor of Economics
Cynthia Bir, Professor of Biomedical Engineering and Orthopaedic Surgery, Emmy Award-winning lead engineer on Sports Science (Fox Sports and ESPN)
Henry Billings Brown, instructor in Medical Law in the 1860s, later US Supreme Court Justice
Winifred B. Chase, botanist; Professor of Botany and Dean of Women
John Corvino, philosopher and author; Professor of Philosophy
Oliver Cox, sociologist; member of the Chicago School
Joanne V. Creighton, expert on women's education; President of Mount Holyoke College
Carl Djerassi, Professor of Chemistry, synthesized the first highly active ingredient for the pill (birth control).
Julia Donovan Darlow, attorney; first woman president of the State Bar of Michigan; Adjunct Professor of Law
Forest Dodrill, MD, inventor of the Dodrill-GMR; first person to perform a successful open heart surgery
John M. Dorsey, MD, Chairman of Psychiatry; author; first to be awarded title of University Professor
 Sorin Draghici, Professor in Computer Science, Robert J. Sokol, MD Endowed Chair in Systems Biology in Reproduction, Director of the James and Patricia Anderson Engineering Ventures Institute, Associate Dean of College of Engineering
Scott Dulchavsky, trauma surgeon; Chief of Surgery at HFHS; NASA Principal Investigator
Joseph W. Eaton, sociologist; anthropologist; listed in Who is Who in the World for his published research and academic career in public and international affairs, social work and public health
Muneer Fareed, Islamic scholar, Secretary General of the Islamic Society of North America
David Fasenfest, Associate Professor of Sociology
Farshad Fotouhi, Professor of Computer Science; Dean of College of Engineering
Douglas Fraser, Adjunct Professor of Labor Relations; former president of the United Auto Workers
Edmund Gettier, philosopher; published Is Justified True Belief Knowledge?
Wallace Givens, mathematician; pioneer in computer science; namesake of the Givens rotation
Martin Glaberman, influential Marxist, Professor Emeritus
Morris Goodman, scientist' editor-in-chief of Molecular Phylogenetics and Evolution journal, Distinguished Professor at the Center for Molecular Medicine and Genetics at Wayne State University School of Medicine
Neil Gordon, Professor and Chair of the Department of Chemistry, founded the Journal of Chemical Education and established the world-renowned Gordon Research Conferences
David Gorski, associate professor of surgery and oncology; known for his blogs critical of alternative medicine
Margaret Hayes Grazier, librarian, author, associate professor from 1965, professor from 1972 to 1983
Suraj N. Gupta, Professor Emeritus, notable for his contributions to quantum field theory; known for developing the Gupta–Bleuler formalism of field quantization
Carla Harryman, poet; essayist; playwright; Professor of Women's Studies and Creative Writing
Matthew Holden, political scientist
 Ian Hornak, Founding artist of the Hyperrealist and Photorealist fine art movements
Jerome Horwitz, PhD, Wayne State University School of Medicine Professor of Internal Medicine and Karmanos Cancer Institute researcher; synthesized the first drug approved for the treatment of AIDS and HIV infection, Zidovudine; synthesized Zalcitabine (ddC) and Stavudine (d4T), the third and fourth drugs approved to treat AIDS
Adrian Kantrowitz, MD, performed the world's first pediatric heart transplant, and the first heart transplant in the United States; Chairman of the Department of Surgery
Ernest Kirkendall, chemist and metallurgist; discovered the Kirkendall effect
Henry E. Kyburg, Jr., expert in probability and logic; known for the Lottery Paradox and for the Kyburgian or epistemological interpretation of probability
Keith Lehrer, philosopher; former professor of Philosophy
M.L. Liebler, taught English, creative writing, world literature, American studies, and labor studies; authored several books of poetry
Jessica Litman, expert on copyright law, Professor of Law
David L. Mackenzie, educator and founding dean
Maryann Mahaffey, former member of the Detroit City Council, Professor Emerita at the School of Social Work
William V. Mayer, professor of Zoology; known for his work in promoting biology education
Forrest McDonald, historian, leading conservative scholar
Ron Milner, author of a Broadway play, professor of creative writing
Boris Mordukhovich, mathematician in the areas of nonlinear analysis, optimization, and control theory; founder of modern variational analysis and generalized differentiation; Distinguished University Professor and Lifetime Scholar of the Academy of Scholars at Wayne State
Frederick Newmeyer, linguist; known for his work on the history of generative syntax and the evolutionary origin of language
Robert Peters, poet, critic, scholar, playwright, editor, and actor; received Guggenheim and National Endowment for the Arts fellowships; won the Alice Fay di Castagnola Award of the Poetry Society of America
Alexey A Petrov, physicist in the area of theoretical particle physics; known for his work in heavy quark phenomenology; received National Science Foundation CAREER Award
Alvin Plantinga, contemporary philosopher; known for his work in epistemology, metaphysics, and the philosophy of religion
Ananda Prasad, biochemist, Distinguished Professor of Medicine
Earl H. Pritchard, Rhodes Scholar; Scholar of China; founder and president of the Association for Asian Studies; first recipient of the Distinguished Civilian Service Medal
Robert Provenzano, MD, Associate Clinical Professor of Medicine at the School of Medicine; expert on chronic kidney disease and kidney transplantation; former president of the Renal Physicians Association
Claude Pruneau, physicist in the area of heavy ion research; known for his work on particle correlation measurements in heavy ion collisions
Rita Richey, professor emeritus of Instructional Technology
Shlomo Sawilowsky, Professor of Educational Statistics and Distinguished Faculty Fellow; founder and editor of the Journal of Modern Applied Statistical Methods
Matthew Seeger, Professor of Communication; Dean of the College of Fine, Performing and Communication Arts
Marvin Schindler, Professor emeritus of German and Slavic Studies
Steven Shaviro, prominent cultural critic
Melvin Small, historian of US Diplomacy; former President of the Peace History Society; author of several award-winning books
Calvin L. Stevens, chemist, professor of Organic Chemistry; known for being the first to synthesize the drug ketamine
Mary Chase Perry Stratton, ceramic artist; founder of Pewabic Pottery
Emanuel Tanay, forensic psychiatrist
Athan Theoharis, expert on U.S. intelligence agencies, primarily the FBI
William Lay Thompson, Professor Emeritus of Biological Sciences, expert on bird vocalizations, past President of the Michigan Audubon Society and past Editor of the Jack Pine Warbler
Brian VanGorder, defensive coordinator for the Atlanta Falcons; former football head coach
Sergei Voloshin, physicist in the area of heavy ion research; known for his work on event-by-event physics in heavy ion collisions
Barrett Watten, poet; educator; professor of modernism and cultural studies
Joseph Weizenbaum, Professor emeritus of computer science at MIT; created early computer in 1952 at Wayne State University
Frank H. Wu, lawyer and author; former dean of the law school
Robert Zieger, labor historian; recipient of the Taft Labor History Award; professor of history
Wolf W. Zuelzer, Professor of Pediatric Research

References 

Wayne State University people
Wayne State University people